

Major Associations

Academy Awards
The Academy Awards are a set of awards given annually for excellence of cinematic achievements. The awards, organized by the Academy of Motion Picture Arts and Sciences, were first held in 1929 at the Hollywood Roosevelt Hotel. Hooper has received one award from one nomination.

BAFTA Film Awards
The BAFTA Award is an annual award show presented by the British Academy of Film and Television Arts. The awards were founded in 1947 as The British Film Academy, by David Lean, Alexander Korda, Carol Reed, Charles Laughton, Roger Manvell and others. Hooper has received one award from four nominations.

BAFTA TV Awards

Golden Globe Awards
The Golden Globe Award is an accolade bestowed by the 93 members of the Hollywood Foreign Press Association (HFPA) recognizing excellence in film and television, both domestic and foreign.

Primetime Emmy Awards

Guild Awards

Directors Guild of America Awards

Miscellaneous Awards

Golden Raspberry Awards

Other awards

References

Lists of awards received by film director